Tyson B. Neal is an American college baseball coach and former player. He served as head coach of the Cincinnati Bearcats baseball team from 2014 to 2017.

Neal was a four-year letterman at Miami, earning 19 victories as a pitcher. He began his coaching career as an assistant with the RedHawks for one season before moving to Southern Illinois for three years. After a one-year return to Miami, he spent a year on staff at Cincinnati and an eight-year stint with Indiana, where he added pitching coach and recruiting coordinator duties.  In 2013, he helped lead the Hoosiers to their first College World Series. On June 7, 2013, Neal was named head coach at Cincinnati, and took over the duties following Indiana's elimination from the 2013 College World Series. On May 23, 2017, two days before Cincinnati was scheduled to play its first game in the American Athletic Conference tournament, it was announced Neal would step down from his head coaching responsibilities. The announcement cited personal reasons as the only factor.

Head coaching record
The following is a table of Neal's yearly records as an NCAA head baseball coach.

References

Living people
Baseball players from Ohio
Cincinnati Bearcats baseball coaches
Indiana Hoosiers baseball coaches
Miami RedHawks baseball coaches
Miami RedHawks baseball players
Southern Illinois Salukis baseball coaches
Arizona State Sun Devils baseball coaches
Year of birth missing (living people)